Richard Henry Beale (13 May 1920 – 27 March 2017) was a British actor. He had a long career in television, stage and film, dating back to the 1950s.

Early years
Born in Hackney, London, England, Beale was the son of Henry and Constance Beale. He served as a Lieutenant in the Royal Navy during the Second World War. He worked ten years at his father's printing business before he ventured into acting.

Career
Beale's early films included The Battle of the River Plate (1956), A Night to Remember (1958), and Sink the Bismarck! (1960).

Personal life
His wife, whom he divorced, was named Anne. They had two children.

Death
He died 27 March 2017 at the age of 96.

Selected filmography

The Battle of the River Plate (1956) – Capt. Pottinger (uncredited)
A Night to Remember (1958) – Harbour Pilot (uncredited)
Sink the Bismarck! (1960) – Petty Officer in Phone Montage (uncredited)
The Flood (1963) – Grout
Compact (1963–1964, TV Series) – Detective Sergeant Birling
The Caves of Steel (1964) – Controller
Gideon's Way (1964) – Capt. Vanner
Doctor Who (1966–1973, TV Series) – Minister of Ecology / Broadcaster / Propaganda Seller / Bat Masterson / Refusian (voice)
Where Eagles Dare (1968) – Telephone Orderly (uncredited)
Softly Softly (1970, TV Series) – Harry
Jude the Obscure (1971, TV Mini-Series) – Chivers
Young Winston (1972) – Boer Sentry (uncredited)
Z-Cars (1972–1974, TV Series) – Bordman / Peters
War and Peace (1973, TV Series) – Hetman
Special Branch (1974, TV Series) – Commander Glover
Dixon of Dock Green (1975, TV Series) – Fred Gilbraithe
Madame Bovary (1975, TV series) – Rouault
Emmerdale Farm (1979, TV Series) – Tober Moore
Secret Army (1979, TV Series) – Inspector Benet
Stay with Me Till Morning (1981, TV series) – Jesse Thomas
The Life and Times of David Lloyd George (1981, TV Series) – Lord Kitchener
Bergerac (1983, TV Series) – Bank Manager
Camille (1984, TV Movie) – Farmer
C.A.T.S. Eyes (1985, TV Series) – Prinley
The Tripods (1985, TV Series) – Ulf
Return to Treasure Island (1986, TV Series) – Captain Smollett
A Handful of Dust (1988) – Ben
The Bill (1988–1996, TV Series) – Geoffrey Rowley / Walter Lepore / Tommy Reeves / Goodhall
A Bit of a Do (1989, TV Series) – Lester Griddle
Treasure Island (1990, TV Movie) – Mr. Arrow
Agatha Christie's Poirot (1990, TV Series) – Merritt
EastEnders (1990–1991, TV Series) – Jackie Stone
Hedd Wyn (1992) – Army Representative
Lovejoy (1994, TV Series) – Mervyn The Fisherman
Food of Love (1997) – William
Peak Practice (2002, TV Series) – Julian Rankin
All About Me (2002) – Local
Casualty (2004, TV Series) – Geoff Slavin
Afterlife (2005, TV Series) – Mr. Keyhoe (final appearance)

References

External links
 
 Richard Beale at Theatricalia

1920 births
2017 deaths
British male film actors
British male soap opera actors
Royal Navy officers of World War II